Jonas J. Pierce House is a historic home located at Sharpsville, Mercer County, Pennsylvania.  It was built in 1868, and is a three-story, wood-frame residence in the Second Empire style.  It is three bays by five bays, and features a mansard roof and large octagonal tower.  The house was converted to apartments about 1942.

It was added to the National Register of Historic Places in 1996.

References

Houses on the National Register of Historic Places in Pennsylvania
Second Empire architecture in Pennsylvania
Houses completed in 1868
Houses in Mercer County, Pennsylvania
National Register of Historic Places in Mercer County, Pennsylvania